An orbital vehicle is a spacecraft which attains orbit.

Orbit Vehicle, Orbital Vehicle, Orbiter Vehicle, or Orbiting Vehicle may also refer to:
 
 A vehicle capable of orbital spaceflight
 Space Shuttle, a NASA vehicle designated "Orbiter Vehicle"
 Orbiter Vehicle Designation
 ISRO Orbital Vehicle (Gaganyaan), crewed orbital spacecraft
 Orbiting Vehicle (OV), the SATAR series of USAF experimental satellites

See also
 Boeing X-37 (or Orbital Test Vehicle; OTV), a reusable robotic spacecraft
 Experimental Orbital Vehicle (XOV), a secret USAF black project spaceplane
 Orbital launch vehicle
 Orbital transfer vehicle (OTV) or space tug, a class of spacecraft used to transfer spaceborne cargo from one orbit to another
 Orbit (disambiguation)
 Orbital (disambiguation)
 Orbiter (disambiguation)
 OV (disambiguation)
 Vehicle (disambiguation)